This is a list of municipal parks located in Newport News, Virginia under the authority of the Newport News Department of Parks, Recreation and Tourism.

 29th & Oak Minipark
 29th & Terminal Minipark
 47th/Warwick Minipark
 Beechlake Park
 Boulevard Park
 Christopher Newport Park
 Deer Park
 Denbigh Park Boat Ramp
 Endview Plantation
 Highland Court
 Hilton Pier/Ravine
 Huntington Heights
 Huntington Park
 Ivy Farms Park
 JAMA Square
 King-Lincoln Park
 Lake Maury Natural Area
 Lee Hall Plantation
 Lee's Mill
 Municipal Lane Park
 Newport News Park
 Nicewood Park
 Potter's Field
 Queen's Hithe
 Riverview Farm Park
 Skiffe's Creek Park (planned)
 Skiffe's Creek Redoubt
 Stoney Run Park
 Superblock
 Tear Drop Park
 Young's Mill

 
Newport News